31 Cygni, also known as ο1 Cygni, Omicron1 Cygni, or V695 Cygni, is a triple star system about 750 light years away in the constellation Cygnus.

The Bayer designation ο (omicron) has been variously applied to two or three of the stars 30, 31, and 32 Cygni. 31 Cygni has been designated, variously, as ο1 or ο2 Cygni — therefore for clarity, it is preferred to use the Flamsteed designation 31 Cygni.

Some multiple star catalogues designate a 13th-magnitude star  from 31 Cygni A as 31 Cygni B, and HD 192579 as 31 Cygni C.  The 13th-magnitude star is likely to be an unrelated background object.

The spectroscopic pair are an orange supergiant of spectral type K3Ib and a blue-white star likely to be evolving off the main sequence with a spectral type of B2IV-V.  The visible companion is a 7th-magnitude B5 main sequence star.

31 Cygni A is an Algol-type eclipsing binary and ranges between magnitudes 3.73 and 3.89 over a period of ten years.  The eclipsing system has been studied in attempts to determine an accurate direct mass for a red supergiant.  The value  is believed to be accurate to about 2%, but there are some discrepancies in the orbital fit.

30 Cygni is another naked eye star a tenth of a degree away, forming a bright triple.

32 Cygni is about a degree away to the north, also a detached eclipsing binary system. It comprises a large cool evolved star and a small hot main sequence or subgiant companion.

References

Cygnus (constellation)
Cygni, 31
Algol variables
Cygni, V695
7735
Cygni, Omicron1
192577
099675
BD+46 2882
K-type supergiants
B-type main-sequence stars
B-type subgiants